The English singer and songwriter Jessie J has recorded material for three studio albums and she has also collaborated with a variety of other artists on songs for their albums. After signing a recording contract with Lava Records, as part of a joint venture with Universal Republic Jessie J released her debut studio album, Who You Are in 2011. She co-wrote every song on the album in addition to her work with other songwriters and producers including The Invisible Men, Claude Kelly, Max Martin and Dr. Luke. The latter co-wrote and produced the 2011 commercially successful singles "Price Tag" and "Domino", as well as, "Abracadabra". She also collaborated with the French DJ David Guetta on her single "LaserLight" and provided vocals on "Repeat", a song included on Guetta's fifth studio album Nothing but the Beat. The same year, she worked with the English singer-songwriter James Morrison on the single "Up", a track co-written by Morrison and Toby Gad. In 2012, she sang "Silver Lining (Crazy 'Bout You)", a song penned by the American songwriter Diane Warren which was released as a single from the soundtrack for 2012 film Silver Linings Playbook.

In 2013, Jessie J worked with Kelly and Joshua "Ammo" Coleman and co-wrote "Wild", an urban song, which features the rappers Big Sean and Dizzee Rascal. The song served as the lead single from her second studio album Alive (2013), described by Digital Spy critic Lewis Corner as "an accomplished pop record. She teamed-up with StarGate and co-wrote three songs for the album, "Thunder", "Breathe" and "Unite"; the latter two were also co-penned by Sia. She has also collaborated with Rodney "Darkchild" Jerkins that resulted with co-writing the title track of the album. In 2014, she co-penned and provided vocals on "Calling All Hearts", a collaboration with DJ Cassidy and American singer Robin Thicke. The same year, she released "Bang Bang", a duet with the singer Ariana Grande and rapper Nicki Minaj. The pop-soul song was co-written by Martin, Savan Kotecha, Rickard Göransson together with Minaj and served as the lead single from Jessie J's third studio album Sweet Talker (2014). Additionally, the R&B-influenced record, features tracks written by Diplo ("Sweet Talker"), as well as, Terius "The-Dream" Nash and Christopher "Tricky" Stewart ("Loud"). The song "Burnin' Up" features rapper 2 Chainz, while on "Masterpiece" she sings about "self-empowerment", a lyrical theme occasionally discussed on Who You Are.

Songs

Notes

See also 
Jessie J discography

References

External links 
Jessie J discography on AllMusic

 
Songs written by Jessie J
Jessie J